Fadrozole, sold under the brand name Afema (by Novartis), is a selective, nonsteroidal aromatase inhibitor which is or has been used in Japan for the treatment of breast cancer.

References

11β-Hydroxylase inhibitors
27-Hydroxylase inhibitors
Aldosterone synthase inhibitors
Aromatase inhibitors
Hormonal antineoplastic drugs
Imidazopyridines
Nitriles